The following is a list of the lieutenant governors of Manitoba. Though the present day office of the lieutenant governor in Manitoba came into being only upon the province's entry into Canadian Confederation in 1870, the post is a continuation from the first governorship of the Northwest Territories in 1869.

Lieutenant governors of Manitoba, 1870–present

See also
 Office-holders of Canada
 Canadian incumbents by year

Notes

References

External links
 

Manitoba
Lists of people from Manitoba
Lieutenant governors